Danjiangkou Reservoir is a multi-purpose reservoir in Xichuan County, Henan and Danjiangkou City, Hubei province, Central China. Created by the Danjiangkou Dam, it serves as a supply of water for the region as well as irrigation, electricity generation and flood control. It was constructed in 1958, and at the time was one of the largest reservoirs in Asia.

Lakes of Hubei
Reservoirs in China
Xichuan County
Shiyan